Yekaterina Sergeyevna Ilyukhina (born June 19, 1987 in Novosibirsk) is a Russian snowboarder, specializing in parallel giant slalom, an event in which she won a silver medal at the 2010 Winter Olympics.

References

1987 births
Living people
Russian female snowboarders
Olympic snowboarders of Russia
Snowboarders at the 2010 Winter Olympics
Snowboarders at the 2014 Winter Olympics
Olympic silver medalists for Russia
Sportspeople from Novosibirsk
Olympic medalists in snowboarding
Medalists at the 2010 Winter Olympics